T. soli may refer to:

Taibaiella soli, a Gram-negative bacterium.
Terrimonas soli, a Gram-negative bacterium.
Tsukamurella soli, a Gram-positive bacterium.
Tumebacillus soli, a Gram-positive bacterium.